Didymops transversa, the stream cruiser, is a species of emerald in the dragonfly family Macromiidae. It is found in North America.

The IUCN conservation status of Didymops transversa is "LC", least concern, with no immediate threat to the species' survival. The population is stable. The IUCN status was reviewed in 2017.

References

Further reading

External links

 

Corduliidae
Articles created by Qbugbot
Insects described in 1839